Wenxinia saemankumensis is a Gram-negative and non-motile bacterium from the genus of Wenxinia which has been isolated from tidal flat sediments from Saemankum in Korea.

References

Alteromonadales
Bacteria described in 2014